The ReLit Awards are Canadian literary prizes awarded annually to  book-length works in the novel, short-story and poetry categories. Founded in 2000 by Newfoundland filmmaker and author Kenneth J. Harvey.

Subtitled Ideas, Not Money the main title of the awards is short for Regarding Literature, Reinventing Literature, and Relighting Literature. The awards were conceived by Harvey as an alternative to larger mainstream prizes such as the Giller Prize and the Governor General's Awards. There is no money awarded for the prize; in the first two years, the winners received a nominal prize of one Canadian dollar, but since 2003 the recipients have been presented with a silver ring designed by Newfoundland artisan Christopher Kearney, featuring four inlaid movable dials engraved with all of the letters of the alphabet.

The award went on hiatus in the late 2010s, with no shortlists or winners announced for 2018, 2019 or 2020.

It was announced in January 2021 that management of the award has been taken over by Harvey's daughter and author, Katherine Alexandra Harvey, with the project expanding to incorporate an online literary journal and a mentorship program for young writers. In April 2021, the shortlists and winners for all of the hiatus years were announced throughout the month.

Nominees and winners

References

External links 

Awards established in 2000
2000 establishments in Canada
Canadian fiction awards
Short story awards
Canadian poetry awards